Cziffra is a Hungarian surname. Notable people with the surname include:

 Géza von Cziffra (1900–1989), Hungarian and Austrian film director and screenwriter
 György Cziffra (1921–1994), Hungarian virtuoso pianist
 György Cziffra Jr. (1943–1981), Hungarian conductor
 Shirin Aumeeruddy-Cziffra
 Zoltán Cziffra (born 1942), Hungarian triple jumper

See also 
 Cifra (disambiguation)

Hungarian-language surnames